The Singapore football league system organizes association football leagues in Singapore. Association football arrived in the city during the British colonial era. The first ever Nation's cup tournament was held in 1892. Football tournaments continued thereafter.

History 
The Singapore Premier League, formerly known as the S.League, was introduced in 1996 to replace the Semi-Professional FAS Premier League. It is the first Professional football tournament in Singapore where players work under a full-time contract. The Prime League was introduced in 1997 as the reserve team of the Premier Division. It is more or less a professional youth league and youth players who excel there can be promoted to the first team. After the professional league, the Singapore Football League (SFL) is played for clubs associated with the FAS. It makes up the next tier after the professional league and includes two divisions. The SFL Qualification tournament, Singapore Island Wide League or the IWL is the next tier for newly registered Football Association of Singapore clubs compete against each other to gain promotion to the SFL. In 2018, the Prime League was dissolved, making the then called NFL the next tier followed by the IWL.

After the FAS Leagues, the most competitive football tournament is the amateur tournament known as the Cosmopolitan Football League, or the cosmoleague. It consists of mainly expat players in Singapore and teams from the cosmoleague teams are known to have beaten the SFL and IWL clubs in pre-season friendlies. However teams do not gain promotion to IWL or SFL as the tournament is not organised by the FAS.

Current system

Past structure

References

Football in Singapore